State Road 56 in the U.S. state of Indiana is a route that travels the south central part of the state from west to east.

Route description

The western terminus of SR 56 is near Hazleton at U.S. Route 41.  SR 56 heads northeast to Hazleton.  After Hazleton SR 56 turns southeast then back northeast, until State Road 65 (SR 65).  Where SR 56 heads east towards Petersburg, in Petersburg SR 56 is Concurrent with State Road 57 (SR 57), until the intersection with State Road 61 (SR 61).  SR 56 leaves Petersburg concurrent with SR 61 heading south, until SR 56 turns east.  South of Otwell SR 56 has an intersection with State Road 257.  SR 56 enters Jasper on the west side and then has an intersection with U.S. Route 231, the two routes are concurrent until they leave Jasper on the north side of town.  North of Jasper SR 56 turns east towards Paoli passing through French Lick.  East of Paoli SR 56 heads towards Salem passing through an intersection with State Road 337 before passing by the entrance to Salem Speedway.  SR 56 and State Road 60 have a concurrency from the west side of Salem to downtown Salem.  SR 56 leaves Salem heading northeast, then turning east near the southern terminus of State Road 39 (SR 39).  After SR 39, SR 56 passing over Interstate 65 (I-65).  Then SR 56 enters Scottsburg where SR 56 has an intersection with U.S. Route 31.  After leaving Scottsburg, SR 56 has a concurrency with State Road 203 and State Road 3.  Then SR 56 heads toward Hanover where SR 56 and State Road 62 (SR 62) has a concurrency.  East of Hanover SR 62 turns north and SR 56 heads east.  East of the intersection with SR 62, SR 56 has an intersection with State Road 256 (SR 256).  Then SR 56 enters Madison where SR 56 has an intersection with the southern terminus of State Road 7 and a concurrency with U.S. Route 421.  East of Madison SR 56 parallels the Ohio River.  Then in Vevay SR 56 has an intersection with the southern terminus of State Road 129 and the western terminus of State Road 156 (SR 156).  After Vevay SR 56 heads north-northeast toward Aurora passing through intersection with State Road 250, SR 156, and State Road 262, passing through the town of Rising Sun.  The northern terminus SR 56 is at an intersection with U.S. Route 50 and State Road 350.

History 
In the western part of Indiana SR 56 originally followed the same routing at current State Road 64 takes.  In 1930 the east terminus of SR 56 was Lawrenceburg at U.S. Route 52, this route is now part of State Road 1.

East of US 231 in northeastern Dubois County, SR 56 approximates part of the course of the Buffalo Trace (road), a migration route for buffalo that provided a major avenue for travel by Native Americans and Europeans in what is now Southern Indiana.

Major intersections

References

External links

056
Transportation in Dearborn County, Indiana
Transportation in Dubois County, Indiana
Transportation in Gibson County, Indiana
Transportation in Jefferson County, Indiana
Transportation in Ohio County, Indiana
Transportation in Orange County, Indiana
Transportation in Pike County, Indiana
Transportation in Scott County, Indiana
Transportation in Switzerland County, Indiana
Transportation in Washington County, Indiana